AD (Anno Domini) is a designation used to label years following 1 BC in the Julian and Gregorian calendars while Ad (advertisement) is a form of marketing communication.

AD, A.D. or Ad may also refer to:

Art, entertainment, and media

Film and television
 A.D. (film), a 2010 animated zombie horror film
 A.D. (miniseries), a 1985 television miniseries set in ancient Rome
 A.D. The Bible Continues, a 2015 biblical drama television miniseries
 Arrested Development, an American television sitcom

Music
 AD (band), a Christian rock band
 A.D. (album), by Solace

Publications
 A.D.: New Orleans After the Deluge, a nonfiction graphic novel about Hurricane Katrina
 Algemeen Dagblad, a Dutch newspaper
 Architectural Digest, an interior design and landscaping magazine
 AD (poem), by Kenneth Fearing

Other art, entertainment, and media
 Audio description track, a narration track for visually impaired consumers of visual media

Brands and enterprises 
 Alexander Dennis, a British bus manufacturer
 Akcionersko društvo (aкционерско друштво), a Macedonian name for a type of company
 Aktsionerno drujestvo (акционерно дружество), a Bulgarian name for a type of company
 akcionarsko društvo (aкционарско друштво), a Serbian name for a type of company 
 Analog Devices, a semiconductor company

Military 
 Accidental discharge, a mechanical failure of a firearm causing it to fire
 Active duty, a status of full duty or service, usually in the armed forces
 Air defense, anti-aircraft weaponry and systems
 Air Department, part of the British Admiralty
Destroyer tender, a type of support ship (US Navy hull classification symbol AD)
 AD Skyraider, former name of the Douglas A-1 Skyraider, a Navy attack aircraft

Organizations
 Action Directe, French far-left militant group
 Democratic Action (Venezuela) (Spanish: Acción Democrática), social democratic and center-left political party
 Democratic Alliance (Portugal) (Portuguese: Aliança Democrática), a former centre-right political alliance
 Democratic Alternative (Malta) (Maltese: Alternattiva Demokratika), a green political party

People 
 Ad (name), a given name, and a list of people with the name
 ‘Ad, great-grandson of Shem, son of Noah
 Anthony Davis (born 1993), American basketball player
 Antonio Davis (born 1968), American basketball player
 A. D. Loganathan (1888–1949), officer of the Indian National Army
 A. D. Whitfield (born 1943), American football player
 A. D. Winans (born 1936), American poet, essayist, short story writer and publisher
 A.D., nickname of Adrian Peterson (born 1985), American football player

Places
 AD, ISO 3166-1 country for Andorra 
 Abu Dhabi, capital of the United Arab Emirates
 AD, herbarium code for the State Herbarium of South Australia

Professions
 Art director, for a magazine or newspaper
 Assistant director, a film or television crew member
 Athletic director, the administrator of an athletics program

Science and technology

Biology and medicine
 Addison's disease, an endocrine disorder
 Adenovirus, viruses of the family Adenoviridae
 Alzheimer's disease, a neurodegenerative disease
 Anaerobic digestion, processes by which microorganisms break down biodegradable material
 Anti-diarrheal, medication which provides symptomatic relief for diarrhea
 Approximate digestibility, an index measure of the digestibility of animal feed
 Atopic dermatitis, form of skin inflammation
 Atypical depression, a type of depression
 Autosomal dominant, a classification of genetic traits
 Autonomic dysreflexia, a potential medical emergency

Chemistry
 Adamantyl, abbreviated "Ad" in organic chemistry
 Sharpless asymmetric dihydroxylation, a type of organic chemical reaction

Computing
 .ad, the top level domain for Andorra
 Administrative distance, a metric in routing
 Active Directory, software for the management of Microsoft Windows domains
 Administrative domain, a computer networking facility
 Analog-to-digital converter, a type of electronic circuit
 Automatic differentiation, a set of computer programming techniques to speedily compute derivatives
 AD16, the hexadecimal number equal to decimal number 173

Mathematics
 Adjoint representation of a Lie group, abbreviated "Ad" in mathematics
 Axiom of determinacy, a set theory axiom

Physics
 Antiproton Decelerator, a device at the CERN physics laboratory
 Autodynamics, a physics theory

Other uses in science and technology
 Active Disassembly, a technology supporting the cost-effective deconstruction of complex materials

Transportation
 AD, IATA code for:
Air Paradise, a defunct Indonesian airline
 Azul Brazilian Airlines
 Airworthiness Directive, an aircraft maintenance requirement notice

Other uses
 ʿĀd, an ancient Arab tribe, mentioned in the Quran
 Aggregate demand, in macroeconomics
 Anno Diocletiani, an alternative year numbering system
 United States Academic Decathlon, a high school academic competition

See also

 Anno Domini (disambiguation)
BC (disambiguation)
Domino (disambiguation)
Dominus (disambiguation)